Chondroplon bilobatum is a medusoid Ediacaran fossil.
It has sand-filled tubes, although these may not have been sand-filled in life.  It has a shield-like shape, with one end different from the other, and bilateral symmetry, and although it has been suggested that it possesses glide reflection symmetry, such suggestions are based upon a taphonomic effect deforming some specimens.  Chondroplon was originally described by Mary Wade in 1971 from fossils found in South Australia.  It was named after chondrophores — chitinous floats found on some kinds of colonial floating hydroids.

In addition to the Ediacara Hills in South Australia Chondroplon is also found in the White Sea area of Russia.  The host rocks in these areas have been dated as 555 million years old.

The original interpretation was that Chondroplon is a chondrophorine cnidarian. It has also been interpreted as a deformed Dickinsonia.  The Vendobionta theory has them as "fluid–filled quilts".  As with most of the Ediacaran biota, scientists are yet to reach agreement on a firm classification for this enigmatic fossil.

See also
 List of Ediacaran genera

References

Cnidarians
White Sea fossils
Proarticulata
Ediacaran life
Fossils of Russia
Fossil taxa described in 1971